Seminars in Immunology is a peer-reviewed scientific journal that covers research on all aspects of research on immunology. The journal is published by Elsevier. The current Co-Editors are G. Kroemer (Cordeliers Research Centre) and Albert Mantovani (IRCCS Humanitas Research Hospital).

Abstracting and indexing 
The journal is abstracted and indexed in Scopus, the journal has a 2021 impact factor of 10.671.

References

External links 

 

Immunology journals
English-language journals
Elsevier academic journals